Jens Jessen (born 20 October 1967) is a Danish former professional footballer who made 341 appearances in the Superliga for AaB and FC Midtjylland. He also played for Varde IF.

References

1967 births
Living people
Danish men's footballers
Danish Superliga players
Association football midfielders
AaB Fodbold players
FC Midtjylland players